Thomas Edward Siddon,  (born November 9, 1941) is a Canadian aerospace engineer and politician.

Early life and education
Born in Drumheller, Alberta, Siddon pursued engineering, graduating with distinction from the University of Alberta in 1963, winning the Gold Medal in Mechanical Engineering, followed by earning his Masters and Doctorate in aeroacoustics from the University of Toronto, Institute of Aerospace. He became a professor at the University of British Columbia and founded a successful aero-acoustics firm, Siddon-Harford & Associates.

Siddon married Patricia Yackimetz in 1962, with whom he has 5 children. Yackimetz is the niece of Canadian-American psychologist Albert Bandura.

Political career
After serving as City Councillor in Richmond, Briitsh Columbia, for two years, he was first elected to parliament in a 1978 election as a Progressive Conservative Member of Parliament (MP) to represent the British Columbia riding of Burnaby—Richmond—Delta. He was successively elected in five federal elections between 1978 and 1993, and worked under several prime ministers.

When Brian Mulroney became leader of the PC Party, Siddon was appointed the party's science critic in the shadow cabinet. After the Tories won the 1984 election, he was given the cabinet post of Secretary of State for Science and Technology. Siddon proved to be a hard working and competent MP, and was promoted to the Minister of Fisheries and Oceans position on November 21, 1985, in the wake of the tunagate scandal that had forced the resignation of previous minister, John Fraser.

Siddon remained in the Fisheries post for five years, until 1990, overseeing one of the most important eras in Canadian fishing history. By the mid-1980s, it was evident that severe overfishing was soon going to have consequences. Siddon thus attempted to impose stiff quotas on the catch; however, in retrospect, Siddon did not go far enough, and in 1991, a complete moratorium on cod fishing had to be imposed.

In 1990, Siddon moved to the Minister of Indian Affairs and Northern Development position. Shortly after his swearing-in, Siddon was left to tackle another crisis alongside his provincial counterpart John Ciaccia, as the Oka Crisis broke out.

Siddon's greatest legacies and successes were also achieved as Minister of Indian Affairs including the agreement in 1992 to create the new territory of Nunavut, the signing of the Saskatchewan Treaty Land Entitlement Framework Agreement, and the establishment of the British Columbia Treaty Process. As a result of his work during his tenure as Minister, Siddon is recorded as the most successful comprehensive land claim negotiator in Canadian history.

When fellow British Columbian and ally Kim Campbell became PC leader and prime minister in 1993, Siddon was promoted to the senior cabinet, becoming Minister of National Defence on June 25, 1993. In this role, he was responsible for ordering new EH-101 navy helicopters to replace the aging Sea King helicopters. The deal was finalized, but the opposition Liberal Party of Canada made it an election issue and argued that the helicopters were too expensive. After winning the election, the Liberals cancelled the contract and incurred cancellation fees of $500 million (CAD). The Sea Kings have since had numerous crashes and require 30 hours of maintenance for every hour of flight time.

Siddon entered the 1993 election expecting a tough battle. His support for native land claims and his earlier fishing quotas had made him one of the top targets of the new Reform Party of Canada. Siddon ended up finishing third behind Raymond Chan of the Liberal Party and Nick Loenen of Reform.

After federal politics
Siddon returned to the private sector, but remained active in Tory politics. He supported Peter MacKay's leadership bid in 2003, and later became an early advocate of union between the Tories and Canadian Alliance.

Following his federal political career, Siddon remained active as a consultant, lecturer and corporate board member. He speaks frequently on the political challenges of combating global climate change and the long range implications for water supply management. Siddon was the founding chair of the Okanagan Water Stewardship Council, and a member of the RBC Blue Water Advisory Panel. In 2007, he was awarded a Doctorate of Laws from the University of British Columbia | Okanagan, received the University of Alberta Honour Award in 2009, the 2010 UBC Alumni Award of Distinction, and was the 2017 recipient of the University of Toronto Engineering Alumni Hall of Distinction Award.

Siddon made a return to politics when he was elected to the Board of Education in Penticton, BC in November 2008. His campaign was based on more openness by the board with fewer in-camera meetings. Siddon was also a strong vocal opponent to the board's decision to tear down a historic auditorium and gymnasium in the local high school. Following a successful three years on the School Board, in 2011 Siddon decided not to seek re-election, but rather ran for the position of Area 'D' Director for the Regional District of Okanagan Similkameen. Siddon defeated his two contenders, receiving 50.5% support in ballots cast. In 2014 he was re-elected as Area 'D' Director.

In February 2018, Siddon announced that he would be retiring from politics, and that he would not be seeking re-election in October 2018.

Lawsuit
Siddon was successful in settling out of court after hitting outspoken radio commentator Rafe Mair with a massive defamation lawsuit in the mid 1990s. Mair publicly apologized for comments made towards Siddon.

Electoral history

References

External links
 

1941 births
Living people
British Columbia school board members
Canadian aerospace engineers
Canadian academics in engineering
Canadian Anglicans
Canadian Ministers of Indian Affairs and Northern Development
Canadian non-fiction writers
Defence ministers of Canada
Members of the 24th Canadian Ministry
Members of the 25th Canadian Ministry
Members of the House of Commons of Canada from British Columbia
Members of the King's Privy Council for Canada
People from Drumheller
Progressive Conservative Party of Canada MPs
Richmond, British Columbia city councillors
Academic staff of the University of British Columbia